Tuora-Kyuyol is the name of several rural localities in the Sakha Republic, Russia:
Tuora-Kyuyol, Churapchinsky District, Sakha Republic, a selo in Khayakhsytsky Rural Okrug of Churapchinsky District
Tuora-Kyuyol, Tattinsky District, Sakha Republic, a selo in Zhuleysky Rural Okrug of Tattinsky District